Statistics of Bahraini Premier League for the 1983–84 season.

Overview
It was contested by 9 teams, and Muharraq Club won the championship.

League standings

References
Bahrain - List of final tables (RSSSF)

Bahraini Premier League seasons
Bah
1983–84 in Bahraini football